HITF may refer to
Human Interference Task Force, an organization aiming to prevent unintentional entries to radioactive waste facilities
Hillsboro Intermodal Transit Facility, a parking garage in Oregon, U.S. 
Health Insurance Task Force (see Association of British HealthTech Industries)